The Raymond Massey is a cocktail made of rye, ginger syrup, and champagne. The drink’s namesake is Canadian actor Raymond Massey (1896–1983), and the beverage is predominantly consumed in his hometown of Toronto, Ontario.

Ginger syrup can be prepared in advance much as simple syrup, but with the inclusion of ¾ cup of peeled and sliced ginger.

Variations
When gin is substituted for the whisky and lemon juice for the ginger syrup, the drink is called a French 75.

References 

 archived listing for the Raymond Massey.

Cocktails with whisky
Canadian alcoholic drinks
Cocktails with Champagne
Cocktails with rye whisky
Cocktails with gin
Cocktails with lemon juice
Sweet cocktails
Sour cocktails
Bubbly cocktails